Kristen Arnett (born December 16, 1980) is an American fiction author and essayist. Her debut novel, Mostly Dead Things, was a New York Times bestseller.

Early life and education 
Arnett was born and raised in Orlando, Florida, where she attended Winter Park High School. She graduated from Rollins College with a bachelor's degree in English and received her master's degree in library and information science from Florida State University. Arnett was a fellow in the Lambda Writers Retreat for Emerging LGBT Voices in 2013.

Career 
Arnett was a librarian at Rollins College and the Dwayne O. Andreas School of Law at Barry University. She is a columnist for Literary Hub and was selected as a Shearing Fellow at the Black Mountain Institute for the spring 2020 semester.

Writing 
Her first collection of short fiction, Felt in the Jaw, was published by Split Lip Press and received the 2017 Coil Book Award. Arnett is a self-described "7-Eleven scholar" and celebrated the debut of Felt in the Jaw at a 7-Eleven store in Orlando. The short story collection focuses on living as a lesbian in Florida.

Arnett's debut novel, Mostly Dead Things, which was published by Tin House in June 2019, was a New York Times bestseller and received critical acclaim; it was heralded by literary critic Parul Sehgal as her "song of the summer" and by The New Yorker's book critic Katy Waldman as one of the best books of 2019. The book features an openly lesbian main character who runs her family's taxidermy shop after her father dies by suicide.

Arnett's novel, With Teeth, was published by Penguin Random House in 2022.

Arnett's stories have appeared in online and print publications including Guernica magazine, The North American Review, Oprah Magazine, and Gay Magazine. Her essays have been published in various venues including The Rumpus, Electric Literature, and Orlando Weekly.

References

External links 
 

1980 births
Living people
People from Orlando, Florida
Rollins College alumni
Florida State University alumni
American librarians
American women librarians
American LGBT writers
LGBT people from Florida
21st-century American novelists
21st-century American women writers